Higashiyamakōen Station is the name of two train stations in Japan:

 Higashiyama Kōen Station (Nagoya), in Nagoya, Aichi Prefecture.
 Higashiyamakōen Station (Tottori)